Strandfontein may refer to:

 Strandfontein, Cape Town, a resort within Cape Town in the Western Cape province of South Africa
 Strandfontein, Matzikama, a village in the Western Cape province of South Africa